In mathematics, Berger's isoembolic inequality is a result in Riemannian geometry that gives a lower bound on the volume of a Riemannian manifold and also gives a necessary and sufficient condition for the manifold to be isometric to the -dimensional sphere with its usual "round" metric. The theorem is named after the mathematician Marcel Berger, who derived it from an inequality proved by Jerry Kazdan.

Statement of the theorem
Let  be a closed -dimensional Riemannian manifold with injectivity radius . Then

with equality if and only if  is isometric to the -sphere with its usual round metric. This result is known as Berger's isoembolic inequality. The proof relies upon an analytic inequality proved by Kazdan. The original work of Berger and Kazdan appears in the appendices of Arthur Besse's book "Manifolds all of whose geodesics are closed." At this stage, the isoembolic inequality appeared with a non-optimal constant. Sometimes Kazdan's inequality is called Berger–Kazdan inequality.

References

Books.

External links
 

Geometric inequalities
Theorems in Riemannian geometry